Frank Edvard Sve (born 18 February 1968) is a Norwegian politician.

He was elected representative to the Storting from the constituency of Møre og Romsdal for the period 2021–2025, for the Progress Party.

Sve has been member of the representative council of Norges Bank since 2014.

References

1968 births
Living people
Progress Party (Norway) politicians
Møre og Romsdal politicians
Members of the Storting